Bertrand Patrice Charles Kaï (born 6 June 1983) is a New Caledonian international footballer  who plays as a forward for Hienghène Sport and the New Caledonia national team. He is one of only two New Caledonians to be named Oceania Footballer of the Year.

International career
Kaï made his debut for New Caledonia on 14 June 2008 in the 0–0 draw against Vanuatu.

Kaï was called up to New Caledonia's squad for the 2011 Pacific Games. He was the tournament's top scorer with ten goals. Half of Kaï's goal tally for the tournament came in one match, the 9–0 win over Guam on 30 August 2011. He scored all ten of his goals in the group stage before also featuring in the semi-final win over Tahiti and the 2–0 victory over the Solomon Islands in the final.

On 1 June 2012, Kaï scored a hat-trick in New Caledonia's opening game at the 2012 OFC Nations Cup, a 5–2 victory over Vanuatu. He featured in both of New Caledonia's other group stage fixtures but was used sparingly in each game, being substituted at half-time in the 4–3 defeat to Tahiti on 3 June and being introduced from the bench in the second half against Samoa in a 9–0 win on 5 June.

On 8 June, he scored New Caledonia's first goal in a 2–0 win over New Zealand in the semi-final, helping his country to the second Nations Cup final in their history. Kaï played the entirety of the final against Tahiti on 10 June but was unable to prevent a 1–0 loss as New Caledonia finished as runners-up. With four goals, Kaï was the tournament's joint-third top-scorer, tied with Benjamin Totori of the Solomon Islands and Tahiti's Jonathan and Alvin Tehau.

Following his showing at the 2011 Pacific Games and the 2012 OFC Nations Cup, in July 2012 the Oceania Football Confederation announced that Kaï had won the men's Oceania Footballer of the Year award, beating fellow nine fellow nominees including New Zealand's Shane Smeltz and Chris Wood, and Jean Kaltack of Vanuatu. Kaï became only the second footballer from New Caledonia to win the award, following Christian Karembeu's titles in 1995 and 1998, and the first player from the Pacific Islands to be named Oceania's best player since 2005.

Speaking shortly after winning the award, Kaï admitted he was surprised to have beaten off such fierce competition to win the title, saying "To be honest, I couldn't believe [I had won] – it was a real surprise when it was announced. It was only afterwards that I realised what [an] honour it is to have been elected ahead of professional footballers from New Zealand, and I am very proud to have followed in the footsteps of Christian Karembeu...this trophy is also good for New Caledonia football because it shows we have talented players. I would like to thank the football family in my country because without them I could not have reached this level."

In December 2012, Kaï was named New Caledonia's joint Player of the Year along with Patrick Wajoka in the inaugural Football Oscars; both attained 22.38% of the vote in national newspaper Les Nouvelles Calédoniennes. Kaï was also included in the New Caledonian Football Federation's "Team of the Year".

International goals
Scores and results list New Caledonia's goal tally first.

Honours

Club
Hienghène Sport
 New Caledonia Super Ligue: 2017, 2019
 New Caledonia Cup: 2013, 2015, 2019
 OFC Champions League: 2019

AS Magenta
 New Caledonia Super Ligue: 2014

International
New Caledonia
 Pacific Games: 2011

Individual
Pacific Games Golden Boot: 2011
 Oceania Footballer of the Year: 2011
 New Caledonian Football Federation Player of the Year: 2015
 OFC Champions League Golden Ball: 2019

References

External links

Living people
1983 births
New Caledonia international footballers
New Caledonian footballers
Association football forwards
AS Magenta players
Hienghène Sport players
Gaïtcha FCN players
2008 OFC Nations Cup players
2012 OFC Nations Cup players
2016 OFC Nations Cup players